The Roman Catholic Archdiocese of Lomé is the Metropolitan See for the Ecclesiastical province of Lomé in Togo.

History
 April 12, 1892: Established as Apostolic Prefecture of Togo from the Apostolic Prefecture of Dahomey in Benin 
 March 16, 1914: Promoted as Apostolic Vicariate of Togo 
 June 14, 1938: Renamed as Apostolic Vicariate of Lomé 
 September 14, 1955: Promoted as Metropolitan Archdiocese of Lomé

Special churches
The seat of the archbishop is the Cathédrale du Sacré-Cœur in Lomé.

Bishops

Ordinaries
 Vicar Apostolic of Togo 
 Bishop Franz Wolf, S.V.D. (1914.03.16 – 1922.11.24)
Vicars Apostolic of Lomé
 Bishop Jean-Marie Cessou, S.M.A. (1923.03.22 – 1945.03.03)
 Bishop Joseph-Paul Strebler, S.M.A. (1945.11.08 – 1955.09.14 see below)
Metropolitan Archbishops of Lomé
 Archbishop Joseph-Paul Strebler, S.M.A. (see above 1955.09.14 – 1961.06.16)
 Archbishop Robert-Casimir Tonyui Messan Dosseh-Anyron (1962.03.10 – 1992.02.13)
 Archbishop Philippe Fanoko Kossi Kpodzro (1992.12.17 - 2007.06.08)
 Archbishop Denis Komivi Amuzu-Dzakpah (2007.08.15 - 2019.11.23)
 Archbishop Nicodème Anani Barrigah-Benissan (2019.11.23 - present)

Other priest of this diocese who became bishop
Isaac Jogues Agbémenya Kodjo Gaglo, appointed Bishop of Aného in 2007

Suffragan dioceses
 Aného
 Atakpamé
 Dapaong
 Kara
 Kpalimé
 Sokodé

See also
List of Roman Catholic dioceses in Togo

References

Sources
 Catholic Hierarchy Information

External links
 GCatholic.org

Roman Catholic dioceses in Togo

Religious organizations established in 1892
Roman Catholic dioceses and prelatures established in the 19th century
Lomé
A